There are 81 provinces in Turkey. Among the 81 provinces, 30 provinces are designated metropolitan municipalities. Metropolitan municipalities are subdivided into districts, where each district includes a corresponding district municipality, which is a second tier municipality.

History
The first metropolitan municipalities were established in 1984. These were the three most populous cities in Turkey, namely; Istanbul, Ankara, and İzmir. In each metropolitan municipality a number of second level municipalities (ilçe municipality) were established. In 1986, four new metropolitan municipalities were established: Adana, Bursa,  Gaziantep and Konya. Two years later the total number was increased to eight with the addition of Kayseri. In 1993, seven new metropolitan municipalities were established: Antalya, Diyarbakır, Erzurum, Eskişehir, Mersin, Kocaeli and Samsun. Following the earthquake of 1999, Sakarya was also declared a metropolitan municipality.

Before 2004, only the urban centers with populations of more than 750,000 were declared metropolitan centers. However, in 2004, the concept of metropolitan municipality was redefined in Istanbul and Kocaeli, where thenceforth metropolitan municipality borders would overlap with provincial borders. In 2012, this was extended to other metropolitan municipalities. Thus, all provinces with a population in excess of 750,000 were declared metropolitan municipality and accordingly the number of metropolitan municipalities has sharply increased. The following 13 cities became metropolitan municipalities:  

 Aydın
 Balıkesir
 Denizli
 Hatay 
 Malatya
 Manisa
 Kahramanmaraş
 Mardin
 Muğla
 Tekirdağ
 Trabzon
 Şanlıurfa
 Van

With the addition of Ordu in 2013, the total number of the metropolitan municipalities increased to 30.

List of metropolitan areas
 

(Dark blue: Those provinces before 2012, light blue those after 2012)

Since the total population of Turkey is  83,154,997, the population in the 30 provinces make up 77% of the population of the country.

See also
Elections for Metropolitan municipalities in Turkey
2013 Turkish local government reorganisation

Notes

References

External links
The critical Analysis of Transformation of Turkish metropolitan Municipality System 

Turkey
Geography of Turkey
Turkey geography-related lists